Amlach power station is a diversionary-run-of-the-river hydroelectricity power generating station on the Drava river in Austria. The power station is operated by Tiroler Wasserkraft (TIWAG) on river water flowing between Tassenbach, Strassen, Tyrol and Amlach, near Lienz.

It is the only run-of-river power station in Tyrol.

For the official opening in March 1989, a special charter train transported guests, including , directly from Innsbruck Hauptbahnhof to a temporary station on the  close to the power station.

See also
List of power stations in Austria

References

Drava
Amlach
Economy of Tyrol (state)